A stele, or occasionally stela (plural stelas or stelæ), when derived from Latin, is a stone or wooden slab, generally taller than it is wide, erected in the ancient world as a monument. The surface of the stele often has text, ornamentation, or both. These may be inscribed, carved in relief, or painted.

Stelae were created for many reasons. Grave stelae were used for funerary or commemorative purposes. Stelae as slabs of stone would also be used as ancient Greek and Roman government notices or as boundary markers to mark borders or property lines. Stelae were occasionally erected as memorials to battles. For example, along with other memorials, there are more than half-a-dozen steles erected on the battlefield of Waterloo at the locations of notable actions by participants in battle.

A traditional Western gravestone (headstone, tombstone, gravestone, or marker) may technically be considered the modern equivalent of ancient stelae, though the term is very rarely applied in this way. Equally, stele-like forms in non-Western cultures may be called by other terms, and the words "stele"  and "stelae" are most consistently applied in archaeological contexts to objects from Europe, the ancient Near East and Egypt, China, and sometimes Pre-Columbian America.

History

Steles have also been used to publish laws and decrees, to record a ruler's exploits and honors, to mark sacred territories or mortgaged properties, as territorial markers, as the boundary steles of Akhenaton at Amarna, or to commemorate military victories. They were widely used in the ancient Near East, Mesopotamia, Greece, Egypt, Somalia, Eritrea, Ethiopia, and, most likely independently, in China and elsewhere in the Far East, and, independently, by Mesoamerican civilisations, notably the Olmec and Maya.

The large number of steles, including inscriptions, surviving from ancient Egypt and in Central America constitute one of the largest and most significant sources of information on those civilisations, in particular Maya stelae.  The most famous example of an inscribed stela leading to increased understanding is the Rosetta Stone, which led to the breakthrough allowing Egyptian hieroglyphs to be read.  An informative stele of Tiglath-Pileser III is preserved in the British Museum. Two steles built into the walls of a church are major documents relating to the Etruscan language.

Standing stones (menhirs), set up without inscriptions from Libya in North Africa to Scotland, were monuments of pre-literate Megalithic cultures in the Late Stone Age. The Pictish stones of Scotland, often intricately carved, date from between the 6th and 9th centuries.

An obelisk is a specialized kind of stele. The Insular high crosses of Ireland and Britain are specialized steles. Totem poles of North and South America that are made out of stone may also be considered a specialized type of stele. Gravestones, typically with inscribed name and often with inscribed epitaph, are among the most common types of stele seen in Western culture.

Most recently, in the Memorial to the Murdered Jews of Europe in Berlin, the architect Peter Eisenman created a field of some 2,700 blank steles. The memorial is meant to be read not only as the field, but also as an erasure of data that refer to memory of the Holocaust.

Egypt

Egyptian steles (or Stelae, Books of Stone) have been found dating as far back as the First Dynasty of Egypt. These vertical slabs of stone are used as tombstones, for religious usage, and to mark boundaries, and are most commonly made of limestone and sandstone, or harder kinds of stone such as granite or diorite, but wood was also used in later times.

Stele fulfilled several functions. There were votive, commemorative, and liminal or boundary stelae, but the largest group was the tomb stelae. Their picture area showed the owner of the stele, often with his family, and an inscription listed the name and titles of the deceased after a prayer to one, or several, of the gods of the dead and request for offerings. Less frequently, an autobiographical text provided additional information about the individual's life.

In the mastaba tombs of the Old Kingdom (2686 - 2181 BC), stelae functioned as false doors, symbolizing passage between the present and the afterlife, which allowed the deceased to receive offerings. These were both real and represented by formulae on the false door.

Liminal, or boundary, stele were used to mark size and location of fields and the country's borders. Votive stelae were exclusively erected in temples by pilgrims to pay homage to the gods or sacred animals. Commemorative stelae were placed in temples by the pharaoh, or his senior officials, detailing important events of his reign. Some of the most widely known Egyptian stelae include: the Kamose Stelae, recounting the defeat of the Hyksos; the  Victory Stele, describing the campaigns of the Nubian pharaoh Piye as he reconquered the country; the Restoration Stele of Tutankhamun (1336 - 1327 BC), detailing the religious reforms enacted after the Amarna period; and the Merneptah Stele, which features the first known historical mention of the Israelites. In Ptolemaic times (332 - 30 BC), decrees issued by the pharaoh and the priesthood were inscribed on stelae in hieroglyphs, demotic script and Greek, the most famous example of which is the Rosetta Stone.

Urartu
Urartian steles were freestanding stone obelisks that served a variety of purposes, erected in the Iron Age kingdom which existed in the Armenian Highlands of modern Armenia, Turkey and Iran between the 9th and 6th centuries BC. Some were located within temple complexes, set within monumental rock-cut niches (such as the niche of the Rock of Van, discovered by Marr and Orbeli in 1916), or erected beside tombs. Others stood in isolated positions and, such as the Kelashin Stele, had a commemorative function or served as boundary markers. Although sometimes plain, most bore a cuneiform inscription that would detail the stele's function or the reasons for its erection. The stele from Van's "western niche" contained annals of the reign of Sarduri II, with events detailed yearly and with each year separated by the phrase "For the God Haldi I accomplished these deeds". Urartian steles are sometimes found reused as Christian Armenian gravestones or as spolia in Armenian churches - Maranci suggests this reuse was a deliberate desire to capitalize on the potency of the past. Some scholars have suggested Urartian steles may have influenced the development of the Armenian khachkar.

Greece

Greek funerary markers, especially in Attica, had a long and evolutionary history in Athens. From public and extravagant processional funerals to different types of pottery used to store ashes after cremation, visibility has always been a large part of Ancient Greek funerary markers in Athens. Regarding stelai (Greek plural of stele), in the period of the Archaic style in Ancient Athens (600 BC) stele often showed certain archetypes of figures, such as the male athlete. Generally their figures were singular, though there are instances of two or more figures from this time period. Moving into the 6th and 5th centuries BC, Greek stelai declined and then rose in popularity again in Athens and evolved to show scenes with multiple figures, often of a family unit or a household scene. One such notable example is the Stele of Hegeso. Typically grave stelai are made of marble and carved in relief, and like most Ancient Greek sculpture they were vibrantly painted. For more examples of stelai, the Getty Museum's published Catalog of Greek Funerary Sculpture is a valuable resource

China

Steles (Chinese: bēi 碑) have been the major medium of stone inscription in China since the Tang dynasty. Chinese steles are generally rectangular stone tablets upon which Chinese characters are carved intaglio with a funerary, commemorative, or edifying text. They can commemorate talented writers and officials, inscribe poems, portraits, or maps, and frequently contain the calligraphy of famous historical figures. In addition to their commemorative value, many Chinese steles are regarded as exemplars of traditional Chinese calligraphic scripts, especially the clerical script.

Chinese steles from before the Tang dynasty are rare: there are a handful from before the Qin dynasty, roughly a dozen from the Western Han, 160 from the Eastern Han, and several hundred from the Wei, Jin, Northern and Southern, and Sui dynasties.  During the Han dynasty, tomb inscriptions (mùzhì) containing biographical information on deceased people began to be written on stone tablets rather than wooden ones.

Erecting steles at tombs or temples eventually became a widespread social and religious phenomenon. Emperors found it necessary to promulgate laws, regulating the use of funerary steles by the population. The Ming dynasty laws, instituted in the 14th century by its founder the Hongwu Emperor, listed a number of stele types available as status symbols to various ranks of the nobility and officialdom: the top noblemen and mandarins were eligible for steles installed on top of a stone tortoise and crowned with hornless dragons, while the lower-level officials had to be satisfied with steles with plain rounded tops, standing on simple rectangular pedestals.

Steles are found at nearly every significant mountain and historical site in China. The First Emperor made five tours of his domain in the 3rd century BC and had Li Si make seven stone inscriptions commemorating and praising his work, of which fragments of two survive.

A number of such stone monuments have preserved the origin and history of China's minority religious communities. The 8th-century Christians of Xi'an left behind the Xi'an Stele, which survived adverse events of the later history by being buried underground for several centuries. Steles created by the Kaifeng Jews in 1489, 1512, and 1663, have survived the repeated flooding of the Yellow River that destroyed their synagogue several times,  to tell us something about their world. China's Muslim have a number of steles of considerable antiquity as well, often containing both Chinese and Arabic text.

Thousands of steles, surplus to the original requirements, and no longer associated with the person they were erected for or to, have been assembled in Xi'an's Stele Forest Museum, which is a popular tourist attraction. Elsewhere, many unwanted steles can also be found in selected places in Beijing, such as Dong Yue Miao, the Five Pagoda Temple, and the Bell Tower, again assembled to attract tourists and also as a means of solving the problem faced by local authorities of what to do with them. The long, wordy, and detailed inscriptions on these steles are almost impossible to read for most are lightly engraved on white marble in characters only an inch or so in size, thus being difficult to see since the slabs are often 3m or more tall.

There are more than 100,000 surviving stone inscriptions in China. However, only approximately 30,000 have been transcribed or had rubbings made, and fewer than those 30,000 have been formally studied.

Maya stelae

Maya stelae were fashioned by the Maya civilization of ancient Mesoamerica. They consist of tall sculpted stone shafts or slabs and are often associated with low circular stones referred to as altars, although their actual function is uncertain. Many stelae were sculpted in low relief, although plain monuments are found throughout the Maya region. The sculpting of these monuments spread throughout the Maya area during the Classic Period (250–900 AD), and these pairings of sculpted stelae and circular altars are considered a hallmark of Classic Maya civilization. The earliest dated stela to have been found in situ in the Maya lowlands was recovered from the great city of Tikal in Guatemala.  During the Classic Period almost every Maya kingdom in the southern lowlands raised stelae in its ceremonial centre.

Stelae became closely associated with the concept of divine kingship and declined at the same time as this institution. The production of stelae by the Maya had its origin around 400 BC and continued through to the end of the Classic Period, around 900, although some monuments were reused in the Postclassic (c. 900–1521). The major city of Calakmul in Mexico raised the greatest number of stelae known from any Maya city, at least 166, although they are very poorly preserved.

Hundreds of stelae have been recorded in the Maya region, displaying a wide stylistic variation. Many are upright slabs of limestone sculpted on one or more faces, with available surfaces sculpted with figures carved in relief and with hieroglyphic text. Stelae in a few sites display a much more three-dimensional appearance where locally available stone permits, such as at Copán and Toniná. Plain stelae do not appear to have been painted nor overlaid with stucco decoration, but most Maya stelae were probably brightly painted in red, yellow, black, blue and other colours.

Cambodia 

Khmer inscriptions are a corpus of post-5th century historical texts engraved sometimes on steles, but more generally on materials such as stone and metal ware found in a wide range of mainland Southeast Asia (Cambodia, Vietnam, Thailand and Laos) and relating to the Khmer civilization. The study of Khmer inscriptions is known as Khmer epigraphy.

Khmer inscriptions are the only local written sources for the study of ancient Khmer civilization.

More than 1,200 Khmer inscriptions of varying length have been collected. There was an 'explosion' of Khmer epigraphy from the seventh century, with the earliest recorded Khmer stone inscription dating from 612 AD at Angkor Borei.

Ireland

Ogham stones are vertical grave and boundary markers, erected at hundreds of sites in Ireland throughout the first millennium AD, bearing inscriptions in the Primitive Irish language. They have occasionally been described as "steles."

Horn of Africa

The Horn of Africa contains many stelae. In the highlands of Ethiopia and Eritrea, the Axumites erected a number of large stelae, which served a religious purpose in pre-Christian times. One of these granite columns is the largest such structure in the world, standing at 90 feet.

Additionally, Tiya is one of nine megalithic pillar sites in the central Gurage Zone of Ethiopia. As of 1997, 118 stele were reported in the area. Along with the stelae in the Hadiya Zone, the structures are identified by local residents as Yegragn Dingay or "Gran's stone", in reference to Imam Ahmad ibn Ibrahim al-Ghazi (Ahmad "Gurey" or "Gran"), ruler of the Adal Sultanate.

The stelae at Tiya and other areas in central Ethiopia are similar to those on the route between Djibouti City and Loyada in Djibouti. In the latter area, there are a number of anthropomorphic and phallic stelae, which are associated with graves of rectangular shape flanked by vertical slabs. The Djibouti-Loyada stelae are of uncertain age, and some of them are adorned with a T-shaped symbol.

Near the ancient northwestern town of Amud in Somalia, whenever an old site had the prefix Aw in its name (such as the ruins of Awbare and Awbube), it denoted the final resting place of a local saint. Surveys by A.T. Curle in 1934 on several of these important ruined cities recovered various artefacts, such as pottery and coins, which point to a medieval period of activity at the tail end of the Adal Sultanate's reign. Among these settlements, Aw Barkhadle is surrounded by a number of ancient stelae. Burial sites near Burao likewise feature old stelae.

Notable steles

 Stele of Vespasian
 Code of Hammurabi
 Gwanggaeto Stele
 King Ezana's Stela
 Kul Tigin
 Lemnos stela
 Lapis Niger
 Mesha Stele
 Naram-Sin
 Xi'an Stele
 Pig stele of Edessa
 Stone of Terpon
 The Doctorate steles at the Temple of Literature, Hanoi
 The Ram Khamhaeng stele
 Ukrainian stone stelae
 In Africa:
 Merneptah Stele
 Rosetta Stone
 Boundary Stelae of Akhenaten
 Palermo stone
 Stele of Ankh-ef-en-Khonsu
 The Opa Oranmiyan
 Gao-Saney
 Burao steles
 Stone of the Guanches
 In the Western Hemisphere:
 Mexico: Tres Zapotes Stela C, Izapa Stela 5, La Mojarra Stela 1
 Guatemala: Stela 14 from Piedras Negras
 Honduras: Stela H from Copan
 Peru: Raimondi Stela

Gallery

See also

 Cantabrian stelae
 Headstone
 Kurgan stelae
 Monumental inscription
 Runestone
 Stećci
 Stele of the Vultures

Notes

References

Bibliography
 Boardman, John, ed. The Cambridge Ancient History, Part 1, 2nd Edition,
 Collon, Dominique, et al. "Stele." Grove Art Online. Oxford Art Online. Oxford University Press. Web. 3 Jun. 2015. Subscription required
 
 Pool, Christopher A. Olmec Archaeology and Early Mesoamerica. Cambridge University Press, 2007
 
 
 
 Till, Karen E. The New Berlin: Memory, Politics, Place. University of Minnesota Press, 2005

External links
 The Cesnola collection of Cypriot art: stone sculpture, a fully digitized collection catalog from The Metropolitan Museum of Art Libraries, which contains material on steles
Egyptian Stelae in Field Museum of Natural History, documentation of collection 1936

 
Stone monuments and memorials
Stone sculptures
Inscriptions by type
 
 
Archaeological artefact types
Egyptian artefact types
Heraldic charges
Stones